Real Sporting de Gijón Femenino is the women's football team of Asturian football club Sporting de Gijón.

History
Founded in 1995, the club was renamed as Club Deportivo Escuela de Fútbol de Mareo Femenino in 1999 as part of an agreement with Gijón's town hall, the club decided to rename the team again as Real Sporting de Gijón Femenino in 2016, and to declare it as the official women's section of the club.

The club played from 1996 to 2001 in Primera División, when it was composed by multiple groups.

In 2018, the club signed for the first time players from out from Asturias. Despite not gaining a spot for the smaller Segunda División next season, after spending 18 consecutive seasons in Segunda División, on 31 July 2019, the Royal Spanish Football Federation gave to the club the vacant place of Atlántida Matamá in the newly created Segunda División.

Season by season

Current squad

References

External links
Official website

Sporting de Gijón
Women's football clubs in Spain
Sport in Gijón
Football clubs in Asturias
Association football clubs established in 1995
1995 establishments in Spain
Primera División (women) clubs
Segunda Federación (women) clubs